Pat Oates is an American comedian, author, radio personality, and podcaster.

He has made appearances on TLC and on E!'s The Soup.

Oates hosts a podcast entitled P.O.S (Pat Oates Show formerly known as Pat Oates is Sad) In 2019 he authored a comedy advice book titled How Not to Suck at Comedy. A Connecticut-based comedian, Oates won Foxwoods Resort Casino's Last Comix Standing competition in 2015

Oates was born in Cheshire, Connecticut and has two children, Aislinn and Seamus.

References

American male comedians
21st-century American comedians
American television personalities
Living people
Year of birth missing (living people)
Place of birth missing (living people)